A Council of State is a governmental body in a country, or a subdivision of a country, with a function that varies by jurisdiction. It may be the formal name for the cabinet or it may refer to a non-executive advisory body associated with a head of state. In some countries it functions as a supreme administrative court and is sometimes regarded as the equivalent of a privy council.

Modern
 Belgian Council of State is a judicial and advisory body that assists the executive with obligatory legal advice on each draft law and is the supreme court for administrative justice
 Chinese State Council is the country's highest executive body
 Colombian Council of State
 Cuban Council of State
 Danish Council of State is similar to a privy council with a largely ceremonial role 
 Dutch Council of State is an advisory body that consists of one or two members of the royal family and other members appointed by the Crown
 East Timorese Council of State is the political advisory body of the President of East Timor
 Egyptian Council of State
 Finnish Government is literally referred to as council of state in Finnish and Swedish
 French Council of State is a judicial and advisory body. It assists the executive with legal advice and is the supreme court for administrative justice
 Ghanaian Council of State advises the President of Ghana in the exercise of most of his/her reserve powers 
 Greek Council of State is the supreme administrative court of Greece and also examines all presidential decrees before they are issued
 Irish Council of State advises the President of Ireland in the exercise of most of his/her reserve powers
 Italian Council of State is a legal and administrative consultative body that ensures the legality of public administration.
 Luxembourg Council of State
 Nigerian Council of State
 North Carolina Council of State
 Norwegian Council of State
 South korean State Council is a national council constituted by South Korean cabinet, constitutionally empowered to deliberate important policies of executive branch of South Korean government
 Spanish Council of State
 Philippine Council of State
 Portuguese Council of State is an advisory body of the President of the Republic
 Thai Council of State advises the executive branch on legal matters and until the establishment of the administrative courts in 1999, it also served as the supreme administrative court
 Turkish Council of State is the supreme court for administrative justice

Defunct
 Brazilian Empire's Council of State (1822–1889)
 Council of State of the Socialist Republic of the Union of Burma (1974-1988)
 Council of State of the People's Republic of Kampuchea (1981–1993)
 Chilean Council of State (1976–1980)
 English Council of State (1649–1660)
 State Council of the German Democratic Republic (1960–1990)
 Indian Council of State (1919–1947)
 Ethiopian Council of State (1987–1991)
 Israeli Provisional State Council (1948–1949)
 Japanese Great Council of State (689–1885)
 Liberian Council of State was an interim governing body in the mid-1990s
 Manchukuon General Affairs State Council (1934–1945)
  (1879–1905)
  (1868–1922)
  (1858–)
 Poland:
Polish Kingdom's Council of State (1815-1915)  
Provisional Council of State (1917)
Polish Council of State (1947–1989)
 Romanian State Council (1961–1989)
 Siamese Supreme Council of State (1925–1932)
 Swedish Council of State (1809–1974)
 Tunisian Council of State (1959–2014)
 Vietnamese Council of State (1980–1992)

See also
 Council of State Governments
 State Council
 Council of Ministers
 Privy council
 Counsellor of State

References 

Government institutions
 State